The 2020 NWSL Expansion Draft was a special draft held on November 12, 2020, by the National Women's Soccer League (NWSL) for Racing Louisville FC, an expansion team, to select players from existing teams in the league. Louisville would be able to select up to 18 players from a list of unprotected players provided by the existing nine NWSL teams.

On October 26, 2020, the NWSL announced that Chicago Red Stars would receive full roster protection after executing a trade with Racing Louisville FC.

Format
Each of the NWSL's nine current teams could protect 11 players, with a limit of two United States federation players. Racing Louisville FC could select a maximum of two players (or one United States federation players) per team; they could only select a maximum of two United States federation players in total. All players currently under contract, on loan, or whose NWSL rights are held by an NWSL team (e.g., draft picks, waiver claims, retired players) were eligible for selection unless included on the protected list; only unsigned players who are on an NWSL team's discovery list were exempt.

The timeline for the Expansion Draft process was as follows:
 Thursday, Oct. 22 (1 p.m. ET) – Trade/waiver window closes
 Thursday, Oct. 22 (5 p.m. ET) – All previously unannounced trades announced
 Thursday, Oct. 29 (5 p.m. ET) – End-of-season process deadline
 Wednesday, Nov. 4 (5 p.m. ET) – Protected list due from clubs to the NWSL
 Thursday, Nov. 5 (1 p.m. ET) – Protected/unprotected lists distributed and made public
 Thursday, Nov. 12 – 2020 NWSL Expansion Draft
 Friday, Nov. 13 (9 a.m. ET) – Trade window opens

Draft results
Racing Louisville FC selected 14 players on November 12, 2020.

 Blue highlights indicate United States federation players
 Italics indicate players who are not under contract but whose NWSL playing rights remain with the team

Protected lists by team
After Chicago Red Stars traded for full roster protection, the remaining eight current NWSL teams released their respective protected lists on November 5, 2020.

 Bold indicates players selected in the Expansion Draft
 Blue highlights indicate United States federation players
 Italics indicate players who are not under contract but whose NWSL playing rights remain with the team

Houston Dash

North Carolina Courage

Orlando Pride

Portland Thorns FC

OL Reign

Sky Blue FC

Utah Royals FC

Washington Spirit

See also
List of NWSL drafts
2021 National Women's Soccer League season

References

National Women's Soccer League drafts
2021 National Women's Soccer League season
Racing Louisville FC
NWSL Expansion Draft